Ma'ruf bin Abdul Ghani al Rusafi (1875–1945) (Arabic: معروف الرصافي) was a poet, educationist and literary scholar from Iraq. He is considered by many as a controversial figure in modern Iraqi literature due to his advocacy of freedom and opposition to imperialism and is known as a poet of freedom.

Birth and early life in Baghdad
Maruf al Rusafi is known to have born in 1875 (his birth date has also been reported as 1 January 1877) at Al Rusafa in Baghdad in Iraq in a family of meagre financial means. His father, Abdul Gani, hailing from the Jibara tribe of Kurdish area, died while he was a child and was brought up by his mother, Fathima who was of Turkish ancestry. His early schooling was at the local Madrasa. Aspiring for a military career he joined Al Rushdiyya Military School in Baghdad, but had to leave after three years, having failed the grade. He continued his studies in Religion and Linguistics under an Arabic scholar, Shaikh Mahmud Shukri al Alusi and stayed there for twelve years where he had the opportunity to learn Sufism, Linguistics, Islamic principles and general sciences. After the completion of his studies, Rusafi started working as a teacher of Arabic at an elementary school run by one of his teachers, in Al Rashdiyya, and later, in 1902, moved to a secondary school in Baghdad.

Life in Turkey and Syria
Al Rusafi left for Turkey of the post Young Turk Revolution, in 1908, and started working in Istanbul as an Arabic lecturer at the Royal College. He worked at a local newspaper, Sabil al Rashad and is known to have led an active social life. In 1912, he became a member of the Turkish Chamber of Deputies, representing Al Muthanna district of Iraq and was re-elected  in 1914. After the fall of the Ottoman Empire in 1918, Al Rusafi left Istanbul for Syria as the British authorities in Iraq prevented the return of Iraqis from Turkey. He settled in Damascus in 1919 and started teaching there, but only for a short time of less than one year. The local government of Syria, under Amir Faisal who was the son of the Sherif of Mecca, was also reluctant to accept Rusafi due to Rusafi's opposition of the Arab Congress of 1913 held in Paris and the revolt of 1916 initiated by the Sherif of Mecca.

Brief stay in Jerusalem

The British local government under Gilbert Clayton reportedly in an attempt to keep Al Rusafi away from Iraq, offered him a job at the Teachers' Training College (Dar al-Mu’allimin), through Muhammad Kurd Ali, an acquaintant of Al Rusafi who went on to become the president of the Arab Academy of Damascus. Ma'ruf al Rusafi reached Jerusalem in 1920 and resumed his career as a teacher of Arabic literature at the training college. During his stay in Jerusalem, Rusafi had the opportunity to associate himself with such literary figures as Issaf Nashashibi, the principal of the training college and in whose name, Issaf Nashashibi Center for Culture and Literature was established in 1982, Adil Jabr, the assistant director of education, Khalil al-Sakakini, an Arab nationalist and Nakhlah Zuraiq, an Arabic faculty member at the English College in Jerusalem. The association also provided Rusafi with opportunity to recite his poems at the gatherings and pursue his literary career.

In 1920, when Sir Herbert Samuel, a British Jewish diplomat, was appointed the High Commissioner of Palestine, he made a declaration at the Palestine Arab Congress held at Haifa that a higher college of Arab studies would be established in Jerusalem, a promise never fulfilled. Rusafi, who was also an attendee at the Congress, later wrote in praise of the declaration, an act which is reported to have placed him in disfavour of the Arab nationalists and his students. Though Rusafi tried to pacify the situation by publishing an explanation in the local daily, Mir’at ash-Sharq, his efforts were not successful. A month after the controversy, when the supporters of Talib Pasha al Naqiq, a candidate at the Iraqi elections of 1921, decided to launch a newspaper, Rusafi is reported to have been invited to head the publication. Rusafi left Jerusalem in March 1921, ending his stay of 18 months there.

Return to Iraq
Rusafi is reported to have reached Baghdad on 9 April 1921 and there is unconfirmed reports of him being arrested a few days later. However, it is known that he started a newspaper, Al Amal but the daily had a short life.  In 1923, he joined the committee for translation and arabization as its vice chairman, and in 1924, he became an inspector in the Directorate of Education where he worked till 1927. The next move was as the professor of Arabic at the Higher Teachers Institute in 1927. In 1930, he was elected to the Parliament but continued his teaching job till 1937, after which his life is known to be in isolation. Reports are available that Rusafi spent his last days in poverty, working in a tobacco shop in Baghdad. He died on 16 March 1945.

A bronze statue of Maruf Al Rusafi has been erected at the Rashid Street intersection, in Baghdad, near Souq al Sarai.

Political and social activism
Maruf Rusafi is known to have used his writing to bring out the social and political issues of the Middle East society, especially Iraqi society. His writings during his stay in Turkey are reported to be commentaries on the Ottoman period. He is regarded by many as the founder of the social school of poetry in Iraq. He is also known to have written in defence of women and widows and is seen as a strong advocate of education and knowledge. Some of his poems have been critical of the British occupation of Iraq of 1920, in the wake of the rise of King Faisal I to power after the World War I. Khalid Muhammed Hafiz, erstwhile judge of Faluja had a collection of manuscripts about his interaction with Rusafi which revealed Rusafi as moderate in his religious beliefs. The manuscript was later published by Yousuf Izz ad Deen, along with his own critical study of Rusafi's poems, as a book, Al-Rusafi Yarwi Seerat Hayatih.

Literary works
He has written many pieces, one of which was important towards society and politics. One of his poems, 'A Praise to the Development of the Future' talked about how "people are too proud of their history rather than developing their future." Maruf Rusafi was acquainted with western literature through Turkish translations and his writing career started while he was in Istanbul by way of socio political articles in journals such as Al Muqtataf and Al Muayyad, published from Syria and Egypt. His first book of poetry, Diwan, was released in 1910. Rusafi, who is credited with the adding ideas and values to modern Iraqi poetry, has written on a wide range of topics such as nationalism, society, politics and reforms. His contributions are classified into publications and manuscripts and may be listed as:

Publications
 Diwan - collection of poems in four chapters, Al Kawniyat (7 poems), Al Ijtemaiyat (19 poems), Al Tarikhiyat (9 poems) and Al Wasfiyat (56 poems). The book was republished in 1932, expanded into 11 chapters. The third edition was brought out in 1952 and six more editions have been published since then.
 Al Anashid al Madrasiyah - collection of poems written in 1920.
 Al Ruya - novel in Turkish language, later translated into Arabic. The novel, written in Turkish language during the period of Ottoman Empire and based on the life of Turkish writer, Namık Kemal, is known to have a veiled call for awakening. It was translated into Arabic, after the 1908 Young Turk Revolution.
 Dafu al Hajanah fi Irtidah al Luknah - a book of linguistics composed of words and usages of the Ottoman language, published in 1912 by Sada e Millat.
 Nafu al Taiyb fi al Khitaba wa al Khatib - a compilation of Rusafi's lectures at Madrassa al Waizin, Istanbul, published in 1917 by Al Awqaf al Isalmiya publications.
 Durus fi Tarikh al Lughah al Arabiyah - lecture compilation during Rusafi's tenure as the inspector of Arabic language, delivered at Dar al Muallimin al Aliah, Baghdad, published in 1928.
 Muhadarat al Adab al Arabi (Muhadarat al Adab al Arabi) - collection of speeches during his tenure as the vice president of Translation and committee. It was published in 1921.
 Tamaim al Tarbiyah wa al Talim - collection of poems from Turkey days, published in 1924.
 Compilation of Lectures - collection of lectures given to teachers about the necessity of Arabic teaching, given during his stint at the Ministry of Education as the inspector of Arabic language. Published in 1926.
 Rasail al Taliqat - a three volume work, published in 1944 by Matbatu al Marif publications, Baghdad.
 Ala Babi Sijni Abi al Ala - critical study of Ma Abil Alaa fi Sijnihi, a book written by Taha Hussain. Published in 1947, after Rusafi's death.

Manuscripts
 Al Risālah al Irāqīyah fī al Siyāsah wa al dīn wa al Ijtimā - a socio-political study written during Rusafi's stay in Faluja during 1933 to 1941; published in 1940.
 Khawatir wa Nawadir - critical essays on literature, society, education, religion and politics, published in 1940.
 Kitab al Aalah wa al Idarah…wa ma Yattibi‘uhuma min al Malabis wa al Marafiq wa al Hanat - a book on linguistics and the arabization of usages in foreign languages.
 Al Shakhsiyah al Muhammadiyah au Hallu al Lughz al Muqaddas - a book on Prophet Mohammed, written in two stages; started the compilation in 1928 and completed while in Faluja in 1941.
 Daf al Maraq fi Kalami Ahli al Iraq - a morphological and philological study of Iraqi languages.
 Al Adab Al Rafi fi Mizan al Shir - Lectures on Rhetoric and Metre, delivered during his tenure at Dar al Muallimin, in Baghdad.
 Aarau Abi al Ala - Compilation of the poems of Abul Ala. The original compilation of 1924 was lost and a second compilation was done in 1938.

Rusafi's works have been translated into many languages including Russian.

See also

 Khalil al-Sakakini
 Herbert Samuel, 1st Viscount Samuel
 Gilbert Clayton
 Safa Khulusi

References

Further reading

External links
 
 

1875 births
1945 deaths
People from Baghdad
20th-century Iraqi poets
Iraqi writers
Iraqi politicians
Iraqi educators
Iraqi scholars
20th-century Iraqi writers
20th-century Iraqi educators
19th-century poets of Ottoman Iraq
Members of Iraqi Academy of Sciences